Philip E. Brown was a jurist in the state of Minnesota.

Biography
Brown was born on June 19, 1856 to George O. and Sarah R. Brown in Lafayette County, Wisconsin. On October 8, 1882 he married Ella Ford. He died on February 6, 1915.

Career
Brown was Judge of the 13th District of Minnesota from 1891 to 1910 before serving on the Minnesota State Supreme Court from 1912 to 1913.

References

People from Lafayette County, Wisconsin
Justices of the Minnesota Supreme Court
Minnesota state court judges
1856 births
1915 deaths
19th-century American judges